Good Night is a short film directed by Indian director Geetika Narang. The film is about Madan Mohan Khullar, played by Vinod Nagpal, and his quest for a song - the lyrics of which he can remember only partially.

The story of the film spans a single night in the life of Khullar who is fond of staying awake during nights. He is a music aficionado, and is constantly at loggerheads with his young domestic help Ratan (played by Shivam Pradhan).

Awards 
 Best Short Film Award - MIAAC Film Festival, USA (2009)
 Best Short Film Award - India International Women Film Festival (2008)
 Silver Lamp Tree Award - International Film Festival of India (2008)
 Best Cinematography Award - Fulmarxx Shorts Fest, India (2008)
 Certificate of Merit for Best Short Film - IDPA Awards, India (2009)

Reviews 
 Reel Reviews
 Doctor Flix 
 Films De France
 Daily Info
 Independent Film Reviews
 Movies Online

References

External links 
 
 

2008 films
Indian short films
Indian independent films
2000s Hindi-language films